Bob is the surname of:

 Adam Bob (1967–2019), American football player
 Camille Bob (1937–2015), American rhythm and blues singer and musician
 Fernando Bob (born 1988), Brazilian footballer also known as Bob
 Galina Bob (born 1984), Russian actress
 Hans-Ekkehard Bob (1917–2014), German World War II fighter ace
 Ioan Bob, Bishop of Făgăraş of the Romanian Greek Catholic Church from 1783 to 1830
 Jim Bob, member of Carter the Unstoppable Sex Machine

See also
 Bobb, a surname (and given name)